Čelovce is a village and municipality in the Veľký Krtíš District of the Banská Bystrica Region of southern Slovakia.

History
The village was first mentioned in 1295 (Chal) when it belonged to Hunt family. In the 16th century it passed to Čabraď castle. During this time it suffered war destructions very much.

Genealogical resources

The records for genealogical research are available at the state archive "Statny Archiv in Banska Bystrica, Slovakia"

 Roman Catholic church records (births/marriages/deaths): 1749-1895 (parish B)
 Lutheran church records (births/marriages/deaths): 1784-1896 (parish A)

See also
 List of municipalities and towns in Slovakia

References

External links
 
Statistics.sk
 Dudince.sk
E-obce.sk
Surnames of living people in Celovce

Villages and municipalities in Veľký Krtíš District